Myrddin is a figure in medieval Welsh legend.

Myrddin may also refer to:

 Myrddin (Stargate), a character in the Stargate fictional universe
 Myrddin Emrys, a legendary figure in Arthurian legend
 Myrddin Fardd (1836–1921), Welsh writer